Sundarban Hazi Desarat College, established in 1961, is an undergraduate college in Pathankhali, West Bengal, India. It is affiliated with the University of Calcutta.

Departments

Science

Chemistry
Physics
Mathematics
Botany
Zoology
Anthropology

Arts,Science and Commerce

Bengali
English
History
Political Science
Philosophy
Economics
Education
Commerce
Sanskrit
Geography
Physical Education

Accreditation
Sundarban Hazi Desarat College is recognized by the University Grants Commission (UGC).

See also 
Sundarban Mahavidyalaya
List of colleges affiliated to the University of Calcutta
Education in India
Education in West Bengal

References

External links
Sundarban Hazi Desarat College

Educational institutions established in 1961
University of Calcutta affiliates
Universities and colleges in South 24 Parganas district
1961 establishments in West Bengal